The 1974 African Cup of Nations Final was an association football match between Zaire and Zambia at the Nasser Stadium in Cairo to determine the winner of the 1974 African Cup of Nations, the ninth edition of the African Cup of Nations. The final was drawn 2–2 on 12 March 1974, before Zaire won the replay 2–0 two days later. It was the first African Cup of Nations final that failed to produce a winner after both normal time and extra time.

Details

Final

Replay

References

External links
Details at RSSSF

Final
1974
1974
1974
1973–74 in Zairian football
1973–74 in Zambian football
1970s in Cairo
March 1974 sports events in Africa